The Pakistan women's cricket team toured South Africa to play against the South Africa women's cricket team in May 2019. The tour consisted of three Women's One Day Internationals (WODIs), which formed part of the 2017–20 ICC Women's Championship, and five Women's Twenty20 International (WT20) matches.

Dane van Niekerk, South Africa's regular captain, was unavailable for the tour due to injury, with Suné Luus leading the side in her absence. The WODI series was drawn 1–1, after the third and final match finished as a tie. Only six WODI matches have finished in a tie, with this being the first one involving Pakistan, and the third one to feature South Africa. South Africa won the WT20I series 3–2.

Squads

Ahead of the tour, Diana Baig was ruled out Pakistan's squad with a thumb injury. She was replaced by Fatima Sana.

Tour matches

50-over match: North West Under-17s v Pakistan Women

50-over match: North West Under-17s v Pakistan Women

WODI series

1st WODI

2nd WODI

3rd WODI

WT20I series

1st WT20I

2nd WT20I

3rd WT20I

4th WT20I

5th WT20I

References

External links
 Series home at ESPN Cricinfo

2017–20 ICC Women's Championship
2019 in women's cricket
2019 in Pakistani cricket
2019 in South African cricket
cricket
International cricket competitions in 2019
South Africa 2019
Pakistan 2019
2019 in Pakistani women's sport